The women's handball tournament at the 1992 Summer Olympics was contested by eight teams divided in two groups, with the top two proceeding to the semifinals and the bottom two proceeding to placement matches.

Qualification

Squads

Preliminary round

Group A

Group B

Playoffs

Bracket

Semifinals

Seventh place game

Fifth place game

Bronze medal game

Gold medal game

Rankings and statistics

References

Women's tournament
Women's handball in Spain
Olymp
1992 in Spanish women's sport 
Women's events at the 1992 Summer Olympics